Eulamprotes libertinella is a moth of the family Gelechiidae. It was described by Philipp Christoph Zeller in 1872. It is found in Spain, France, Switzerland, Austria, Italy, the Czech Republic and Bosnia and Herzegovina.

The wingspan is 10.5–11 mm.

References

Moths described in 1872
Eulamprotes